Louis Charles Weller (7 May 1887 – September 1951) was an English professional footballer who played as a left back in the Football League for Everton and Chesterfield Town.

Personal life 
Weller served as a gunner in the Motor Machine Gun Service and the Machine Gun Corps during the First World War.

Career statistics

References 

English Football League players
British Army personnel of World War I
Machine Gun Corps soldiers
1887 births
Association football fullbacks
Association football wing halves
Chesterfield F.C. players
Everton F.C. players
Footballers from Stoke-on-Trent
1951 deaths
English footballers
Motor Machine Gun Service soldiers
Military personnel from Staffordshire